Lumby is a small community of 1,731 people, located near the edge of the Monashee Mountains. It is mainly a logging, manufacturing and agriculture community.

The village is home to a network of trails along the creek beds, known collectively as the Salmon Trail.

Hang gliding and paragliding are very popular in Lumby. The village has hosted many national and international events, usually taking place at nearby Cooper Mountain.

Schools administered by School District 22 Vernon in Lumby include Charles Bloom Secondary School, Crossroads Alternate School and J W Inglis Elementary School.

The community was also home to the Lumby Fighting Saints of the now defunct WHA Junior West Hockey League.

Some of Lumby's prominent employers include: Tolko Industries, Rouck Brothers Sawmill, Valley Pallet Plus, Super A Grocery, Irly Building Centres, Mac's Convenience Stores, Fields, Lumby Hotel and Blue Ox Pub.

Annually, the "Lumby Days" family fair takes place in the beginning of summer, attracting many people from around the valley.

The Village also hosts a winter outhouse race featuring creative entries of three sided outhouses mounted on skis.

On 8 October 2014 a WWII-era Japanese balloon bomb was discovered in the mountains near Lumby by forestry workers. The next day, they reported it to the RCMP. It was then disposed of on site using explosives, as it was too dangerous to move it. All of this happening 70 years after it had been launched.

Lumby had been known as White Valley but one year after his death, the town name was changed to honour Moses Lumby (1842–93). He had a varied career including serving as Government Agent in Vernon, British Columbia and vice-president of the Shuswap and Okanagan Railway.

Climate
Lumby has a humid continental climate with hot summers days and cool nights. Spring and fall are the driest seasons, and summer and winter are the wettest seasons. Fog often sets in during the winter, and can last for days at a time. Lumby is wetter and cooler than Vernon, but is still dry enough to contain natural grasslands, especially on south facing slopes.

During the summer months, Lumby has one of the highest diurnal temperature variations in Canada.

Lumby is at a transition point between the semi-arid dry belt to the west and the interior rainforest to the east. Thus, both wet and dry vegetation are common in Lumby.

Weather facts:
 Driest Year (1967) = 
 Wettest Year (1982) = 
 Warmest Year (1998) = 
 Coldest Year (1996) =

Demographics 

Religion 
According to the 2021 census, religious groups in Lumby included:
Irreligion (1,325 persons or 65.8%)
Christianity (670 persons or 33.3%)
Buddhism (10 persons or 0.5%)
Other (20 persons or 1.0%)

References

External links 

Villages in British Columbia
Populated places in the Regional District of North Okanagan
Logging communities in Canada
Populated places in the Okanagan Country